Emily May Nutsey  (1887–1953) was a New Zealand nurse, civilian and army matron. She was born in Christchurch, Canterbury, New Zealand in 1887.

She was appointed an Associate of the Royal Red Cross in 1918 and was promoted to Member of the Royal Red Cross in 1942. In 1935, she was awarded the King George V Silver Jubilee Medal and she was appointed a Member of the Order of the British Empire in the 1937 Coronation Honours.

References

1887 births
1953 deaths
New Zealand nurses
New Zealand military personnel
People from Christchurch
Members of the Royal Red Cross
New Zealand Members of the Order of the British Empire
New Zealand women nurses